Junaluska may refer to:

 Junaluska, a leader of the Cherokee people
 Junaluska (community), an African-American community in Boone, North Carolina
 Lake Junaluska, North Carolina, a census-designated place
 Mount Junaluska, a mountain in Haywood County, North Carolina now called North Eaglenest Mountain\

See also
 Junaluska salamander